Sir John Everard, 3rd Baronet (c.1665 – 1691) was an Irish Jacobite soldier and politician. 

Everard was the son of Sir Redmond Everard, 2nd Baronet and Elizabeth Butler, and in 1687 he succeeded to his father's baronetcy. He received a commission in the Jacobite army of James II of England as a captain in Nicholas Purcell of Loughmoe's regiment of horse. He was the Member of Parliament for Fethard in the brief Patriot Parliament called by James II in 1689. On 12 July 1691 he was killed in fighting during the Battle of Aughrim and was posthumously attainted and forfeited of his estates.

He married Hon. Eleanor Butler, eldest daughter of Thomas Cahir, 6th Baron Cahir and Elizabeth Matthew. Their son, Redmond Everard, was raised by relatives as a Protestant and subsequently recovered his family's seized estates.

References

Year of birth uncertain
1691 deaths
Baronets in the Baronetage of Ireland
17th-century Irish people
Irish Jacobites
Irish military personnel killed in action
Irish MPs 1689
Irish soldiers in the army of James II of England
Members of the Parliament of Ireland (pre-1801) for County Tipperary constituencies
People convicted under a bill of attainder